Finlay Callaghan (born 15 August 2001) is a Scottish rugby union player for Glasgow Warriors in the United Rugby Championship. Callaghan's primary position is wing or fullback.

Rugby Union career

Professional career

Callaghan was named in the Glasgow Warriors academy squad for the 2021–22 season. He is yet to debut for Glasgow, but has represented Scotland Sevens at two tournaments.

Callaghan competed at the 2022 Rugby World Cup Sevens in Cape Town.

External links
itsrugby Profile

References

2001 births
Living people
Glasgow Warriors players
Rugby union wings
Rugby union fullbacks
Scottish rugby union players